Happy is a 2006 Indian Telugu-language romantic comedy film directed by A. Karunakaran and produced by Allu Aravind under his production Geetha Arts banner. The film stars Allu Arjun, Genelia D'Souza and Manoj Bajpayee while Deepak Shirke, Brahmanandam, Kishore and Tanikella Bharani play supporting roles. The music was scored by Yuvan Shankar Raja. The film is inspired from the 2004 Tamil film Azhagiya Theeye with Radha Mohan providing the story while Karunakaran wrote the screenplay and Kona Venkat penning the dialogues.

The film was released on 27 January 2006.

Plot 

Madhumathi is the daughter of Suryanarayana, a politician who turns out to be a martinet at home with his attachment to power. He believes that his daughter's behavior would influence his caste politics, so he tries to keep her from continuing her MBBS as she goes to college and moves with friends of different mentalities. However, Madhumathi comes to her third year of medicine by maintaining her dignity, focusing completely on studies, and not being involved in any affairs of love. She goes for a medical camp with her classmates to Araku Valley where she meets Bunny in the woods. Her initial encounter with him is funny and playful. Bunny comes to Hyderabad and joins in a pizza shop as a delivery boy and continues his MBA by attending evening classes.

In an incident, Surya thinks that his daughter is dating someone and comes to believe that it's none other than Bunny. Due to this, he decides to get her married to a person of his own caste: Arvind, who is settled as the DCP.

Madhumati is more attached to her studies than marriage. She goes to Bunny and places the blame on him, saying that he was the reason for her marriage. Getting to know that, Bunny plans to stop the marriage and meets Arvind. Bunny lies to Arvind and convinces him that he is in love with Madhumathi. Arvind believes the latter and cancels the wedding. Later on, Surya plans to get her married to his friend's son Subba Rao, an illiterate who doesn't want his newly wed wife to be educated. He visits DCP Arvind and gives him the marriage invitation. Shocked Arvind meets Bunny and gets him married to Madhumathi in a registrar's office. He also gives his new flat for the couple to live in.

Madhumathi becomes estranged from her family and in another series of events, she ends up living with Bunny (or rather Bunny ends up living with her, as he loses his job). Throughout their times together, mishaps and comedic events happen; Bunny ends up falling for Madhumati. Being separated from her family, she has no way of paying for fees and one day, she expresses this to Bunny. He gets into the film industry as a stuntman taking a high risk to his life to pay the semester fees for her MBBS.

Madhumathi scores lowest marks in a subject and gets negative feedback from her professor. To focus on her studies, she scorns Bunny and wants him to be out of the house. She then focuses on her studies and achieves her MBBS degree with honors. On the day of her graduation, she admits to her friend that she is indeed in love with Bunny. Her friend reveals that he risked his life to pay her college tuition fee by doing dangerous stunts. He told her not to tell Madhumathi, and he is going back to Vishakhapatnam that day. With regret, she tries to reconcile with Bunny and goes to meet him at the railway station. On the way there, she gets caught by a roadblock set up by ACP Ratnam, who is her father's nemesis. As she was giving a lift to a sex worker (she did not know at the time), she is jailed under prostitution charges. Soon, Surya is arrested as he storms into the police station and slaps Ratnam, who arrested her in a rage of fury. She manages to contact Bunny with a cell phone provided by one of the inmates, and Bunny comes to the station. He also had an incident with Ratnam as he once berated him in public for smoking in a gas station. He becomes enraged and begins to fight with the police. Bunny and Ratnam have a long and bloody fight until Arvind intervenes and stops the fight. He asks Bunny and Madhumati to leave and says that he will take care of everything and the couple reunite with each other.

Cast

Music 

Songs released on 30 December 2005, was a major highlight and main strength of the film. It features six tracks with 'Sirivennela' Seetharama Sastry, Chandrabose, Kulasekhar, Viswa, Pothula Ravi Kiran, Ananta Sriram having each penned lyrics for one song. Music composer Yuvan Shankar Raja received critical acclaim for the  foot-tapping, brilliant and excellent music of Happy.

Original version

Malayalam version 
Lyrics for all the songs for the Malayalam dubbed version were penned by Siju Thuravoor.

Reception

Critical reception 
Idlebrain.com rated the film 3.5/5 and stated: "Happy is a happy film watch for its songs and comedy." He appreciated the performance of Allu Arjun, songs picturization, and technical values while criticizing the tempo in the latter half.Indiaglitz wrote that: "With a simple story and imaginative screenplay, the movie keeps you engrossed. The combination of enjoyable fun, good music and easy emotions make the film work."

This movie's dubbed version was also released in Kerala titled as Happy be Happy. It ran over 150 days in Kerala and was a blockbuster at the box office. The film created a big wave among the Malayali youth. When Allu Arjun got fans through Arya movie, that stardom got assured in Kerala through this movie.

References

External links 
 

2006 films
2000s Telugu-language films
2006 romantic comedy-drama films
Films directed by A. Karunakaran
Indian romantic comedy-drama films
Telugu remakes of Tamil films
Films scored by Yuvan Shankar Raja
Geetha Arts films
2006 comedy films
2006 drama films
Films shot in Hyderabad, India
Films set in Hyderabad, India